Performative architecture is an architecture using digital technologies to challenge the way the built environment is designed.

People move – Architecture stops. People desire – space defines. The designer as a spatial programmer collects movements and desires and releases them into the conception of building. (Anderson, 2011) 4

Building performance is a guiding design principle as an emerging approach to architecture.
Buildings are often viewed as objects that:
• Result from design and construction techniques
• Represent various practices and ideas. 2

The building's characteristics are a reflection between the materials and to how they create the flexibility to the performance, instead of being a building that creates no movement visually or through. Both visually and structurally, the building is moving; the building complements the performance. 1

Towards the performative in architecture

Architecture in its contemporary environment is heading towards performative art, with the surroundings acting as the stage on which the building is able to perform and be on show. 1

The feelings, qualities, space and quantities of the D-Tower reflect the human roles and relationships with money, colour, value, feelings and action all becoming entwined. 9

Performative Architecture is a “meta-narrative” that has a universal direction that depends on particular performance-related aspects of each project. That is, that the ideas and concepts to do with performative architecture and how it is classified, is known through a common understanding worldwide. 1
Conflict arises when there is an attempt to define performative architecture through a set definition, the concept of performative architecture itself still needs to be developed and further explored to come to a concrete definition. 5
Building appearances are no longer the sole emphasis as dynamics of use, temporal change, poetics of space, indeterminate patterns and processes become a clear indication of performance. 5

The role of the architect in performance is to understand the multiply effects in material and time, rather than to simply predict.

Computing the performative

Technology such as the advances in computer programs opens up possibilities to the emergence of performative-based design, as the Building performance is the guiding principle of form making. 3
Building performance is affected by spatial, social, cultural and financial factors. Advances in digital technology programs, enables new performative structures that otherwise would have been incomprehensible, and it opens up new possibilities being able to see the structure in 3D on the computers before construction. Emphasis is shifting to the processes of form generation, based on performative strategies of design such as structure, acoustics or environment design. 3

Technology has opened up new possibilities for designers to assess certain performance aspects of their designs as it becomes realistic.
Architects and engineers are working in collaboration to create these seemingly impossible performative structures. 7

Movement and Performance

Architecture can be given performative capacity through the movement of people around and through a building.
The experience of structures spatial presence and materiality along with the engagement of the eye and the body which makes architecture performative. 1

The creating of architecture of spectacle and performance comes through the movement of the object/building itself rather than from the subject. 1
The Millennium Bridge in Gateshead, UK, is the world's first rotating bridge, the entire bridge rotates around pivots on both sides of the river so that its tilt creates sufficient clearance for the ships to pass underneath. 8

The mechanics of the building create action, with some parts of the building literally being able to move, such as screens, apertures, and furnishings, although this movement may be mechanical or manual, initiated by human or environmental prompts. 1
An illustration of this aspect of architectural performance is Renzo Piano’s Aurora Place in Sydney, Australia (1996–2000), its exterior surfaces and elements consist of moving and moveable mechanisms. 10

Performative architecture is still under developing ideas as a concrete definition. As the term is widely used but rarely are structures linked back to being performance architecture.

See also
Architecture
Interior design
 Performing arts

References

1. Performative Architecture: Beyond Instrumentality
Edited by Branko Kolarevic and Ali Malkawi

2. Performative Geometries: Transforming Textiles techniques
Edited by Asterios Agkathidis and Gabi Schilling

3. Architecture in the digital age: Design and Manufacturing
Edited by Branko Kolarevic

4. Performative Spaces 2, Platforms for everyone – Ben Anderson

5. Anthony Vidler, 2001 Diagrams of Diagrams: Architecture Abstraction and Modern Representation. Viewed 10 October 2011.
5. https://www.scribd.com/doc/37594404/Anthony-Vidler-Diagrams-of-Diagrams-Architectural

6. Giulio Jacucci and Ina Wagner, PERFORMATIVE USES OF SPACE IN MIXED MEDIA ENVIRONMENTS. Viewed 10 October 2011 .https://www.hiit.fi/files/admin/sab/SAB04/material/UERG/24_jacucci_wagner_phd.pdf

7. Any Magazine, no 0. Probable Geometries; The Architecture of Writing in Bodies, viewed 10 October 2011.
http://www.lcc.gatech.edu/~xinwei/classes/readings/Lynn/LynnProbableGeometries.pdf

8. Jose Miguel Hernandez Blog, 2011, Hernandez Blog, viewed 13 October 2011. http://www.jmhdezhdez.com/2011/06/millenium-bridge-newcastle-wilkinson.html

9. templates.com, 2008, Public Art: Astonishing Ideas, viewed 14 October 2011.
https://web.archive.org/web/20111108130851/http://www.templates.com/blog/public-art-astonishing-ideas/

10. Jim O’Rourke, 2004, Controversial building takes design awards, viewed 13 October 2011.
http://www.smh.com.au/articles/2004/07/17/1089694608988.html

Architectural terminology